Fergal Whitely (born 1997) is an Irish hurler who plays for Dublin Senior Championship club Kilmacud Crokes and at inter-county level with the Dublin senior hurling team. He usually lines out as a wing-forward.

Career

A member of the Kilmacud Crokes club, Whitely first came to prominence on the inter-county scene as a member of the Dublin minor team that in 2015. He subsequently lined out with the Dublin under-21 team as well as with DCU Dóchas Éireann in the Fitzgibbon Cup. Whitely was later added to the Dublin senior hurling team, making his debut during the 2017 National Hurling League.

Career statistics

References

External links
Fergal Whitely profile at the Dublin GAA website

1997 births
Living people
Dublin inter-county hurlers
Irish schoolteachers
Kilmacud Crokes hurlers